Cynodon is a genus of plants in the grass family. It is native to warm temperate to tropical regions of the Old World, as well as being cultivated and naturalized in the New World and on many oceanic islands.

The genus name comes from Greek words meaning "dog-tooth". The genus as a whole as well as its species are commonly known as Bermuda grass or dog's tooth grass.

 Species
 Cynodon aethiopicus - Africa; introduced in South Africa, Queensland, Hawaii, Texas
 Cynodon barberi - India, Sri Lanka
 Cynodon coursii - Madagascar
 Cynodon dactylon - Old World; introduced in New World and on various islands
 Cynodon incompletus - southern Africa; introduced in Australia, Argentina
 Cynodon × magennisii - Limpopo, Gauteng, Mpumalanga; introduced in Texas, Alabama
 Cynodon nlemfuensis - Africa from Ethiopia to Zimbabwe; introduced in South Africa, West Africa, Saudi Arabia, Philippines, Texas, Florida, Mesoamerica, northern South America, various islands
 Cynodon plectostachyus - Chad, East Africa; introduced in Madagascar, Bangladesh, Mexico, West Indies, Paraguay, northeastern Argentina, Texas, California
 Cynodon radiatus - China, Indian Subcontinent, Southeast Asia, Madagascar; introduced in  Australia, New Guinea
 Cynodon transvaalensis - South Africa, Lesotho; introduced in  other parts of Africa plus in scattered locales in Iran, Australia, and the Americas

 Formerly included
Several species now considered better suited to other genera, namely Arundo, Bouteloua, Brachyachne, Chloris, Cortaderia, Ctenium, Digitaria, Diplachne, Eleusine, Enteropogon, Eragrostis, Eustachys, Gynerium, Leptochloa, Molinia, Muhlenbergia, Phragmites, Poa, Spartina, Tridens, and Trigonochloa.

Cultivation and uses
Some species, most commonly C. dactylon, are grown as lawn grasses in warm temperate regions, such as the Sunbelt area of the United States where they are valued for their drought tolerance compared to most other lawn grasses. Propagation is by rhizomes, stolons, or seeds. In some cases it is considered to be a weed; it spreads through lawns and flower beds, where it can be difficult to kill with herbicides without damaging other grasses or plants. It is difficult to pull out because the rhizomes and stolons break readily, and then re-grow.

It is also noted for its common use on the surface of greens on golf courses, as well as football and baseball playing fields.

Recent news reports claim that a Bermuda-derived F1 hybrid called Tifton 85 suddenly started producing cyanide and killed a cattle herd in Texas, USA.

References

External links

 Genus Cynodon on ITIS Report
 Cynodon on USDA/Natural Resource Conservation Service
  Lawn Maintenance Calendar (North Carolina)

Chloridoideae
Lawn grasses
Poaceae genera